An assassination attempt on Ali Khamenei occurred on 27 June 1981. When he gave the speech for prayers at the Abuzar Mosque, a bomb in the tape recorder placed in front of him exploded and his arm, vocal cords and lungs were seriously injured.

Background

In the early years after the Iranian revolution, two parties called Imam and Liberal Line were forces in the official political structure of the country. Khamenei was in the Imam line and the Liberal Faction chief was Abolhassan Banisadr. Khamenei opposed the liberal and nationalist factions. He opposed the interim government for maintaining the US military office in Iran. In the case of the choice of ministers, the deputies of ministers and the issue of cleaning in government agencies and organizations, with the choice of people who were in favor of compromise with the United States. After the lack of political adequacy of Bani Sadr for the presidency in the Islamic Consultative Assembly on June 30, 1981,  Khamenei spoke in agreement with the plan. Khamenei was the first person who was assassinated in events and currents after the remuneration of Bani Sadr, the commandment of the whole force and presidency was assassinated.

The assassinations in June 1981 commenced by attacking Ali Khamenei and was followed by a bombing at the headquarters of the Islamic Republican Party (IRP) in Tehran.

Event
Five days after Banisadr was deposed, the news of the day was about the Iran–Iraq War after the declaration of armed conflict. On 27 June 1981, while Ali Khamenei had returned from the frontline and had visited the Ayatollah Khomeini, he went to the Abuzar Mosque to give a speech to the prayers as per his Saturday schedule. At that time, he was the Ayatollah Khomeini’s representative at the Supreme Council of National Defense. After the first prayer, Ayatollah Khamenei began to answer questions submitted by attendees. A tape recorder with papers was set on the desk in front of Ali Khamenei by a young man who pressed the play button. After one minute the tape recorder sounded like a loud whistle and then exploded. After the bombing the clerics praying at the mosque said that the tape recorder was divided into two parts and on the inner wall of the tape recorder was written "the gift of Forqan Group to Islamic republic".

The convalescence of Ayatollah Khamenei took several months and his arm, vocal cords and lungs were seriously injured.

Perpetrator 
According to the sources, some people said Masud Taqi Zade from Furqan Group was the perpetrator of assassination attempt and others said Mohammad Javad Qadiry from Mujahedin-e Khalq was the perpetrator.

On the article from Iraj Mesdaqi, political activist he denied Qadiry as perpetrator of this adventure and introduced Orooj Amir Khan Zade. The Islamic Revolution Document Center identified the person who delivered the recorder as Masud Taqi Zade.

See also
 Assassination and terrorism in Iran

References

1981 crimes in Iran
Attempted Assassination
Failed assassination attempts in Asia
Explosions in 1981